The following lists events that happened during 1909 in the Canada.

Incumbents

Crown 
 Monarch – Edward VII

Federal government 
 Governor General – Albert Grey, 4th Earl Grey 
 Prime Minister – Wilfrid Laurier
 Chief Justice – Charles Fitzpatrick (Quebec) 
 Parliament – 11th (from 20 January)

Provincial governments

Lieutenant governors 
Lieutenant Governor of Alberta – George Hedley Vicars Bulyea 
Lieutenant Governor of British Columbia – James Dunsmuir (until December 3) then Thomas Wilson Paterson  
Lieutenant Governor of Manitoba – Daniel Hunter McMillan
Lieutenant Governor of New Brunswick – Lemuel John Tweedie 
Lieutenant Governor of Nova Scotia – Duncan Cameron Fraser   
Lieutenant Governor of Ontario – John Morison Gibson  
Lieutenant Governor of Prince Edward Island – Donald Alexander MacKinnon 
Lieutenant Governor of Quebec – Charles Alphonse Pantaléon Pelletier 
Lieutenant Governor of Saskatchewan – Amédée Forget

Premiers 
Premier of Alberta – Alexander Cameron Rutherford    
Premier of British Columbia – Richard McBride  
Premier of Manitoba – Rodmond Roblin  
Premier of New Brunswick – John Douglas Hazen
Premier of Nova Scotia – George Henry Murray 
Premier of Ontario – James Whitney   
Premier of Prince Edward Island – Francis Haszard   
Premier of Quebec – Lomer Gouin  
Premier of Saskatchewan – Thomas Walter Scott

Territorial governments

Commissioners
 Commissioner of Yukon – Alexander Henderson 
 Gold Commissioner of Yukon – F.X. Gosselin 
 Commissioner of Northwest Territories – Frederick D. White

Events
 January 11 – The Boundary Waters Treaty signed.
 February 23 – The first powered flight in Canada is made by John McCurdy in the AEA Silver Dart, flying  from the ice of Bras d'Or Lake at Baddeck on Cape Breton Island.
 March 22 – 1909 Alberta election: Alexander Rutherford's Liberals win a second consecutive majority.
 April 6 – Robert Peary claims to have reached the North Pole.
 July 13 – Gold is discovered near Cochrane, Ontario.
 August – The Canadian Pacific Railway's Spiral Tunnels are opened in British Columbia's Kicking Horse Pass.
 September 2 – Jeanne Mance Monument unveiled in Montreal.
 September 6 – Field Day Sports athletic competition Toronto.
 October 13 – The Ontario Provincial Police is established.

Full date unknown
 University of Toronto Schools opens as an all-boys school.
 Leon's furniture store opens.
 The Criminal Code is amended to criminalize the abduction of women. Before this, the abduction of any woman over 16 was legal, except if she was an heiress.

Arts and literature
March 22 – Gabrielle Roy, French Canadian author (died 1983)
October 24 – Sheila Watson (Sheila Doherty), Canadian novelist and critic (died 1998)

Sport 
 December 4 – University of Toronto defeats the Toronto Parkdale Canoe Club 26–6 to win the 1st Grey Cup at Rosedale Field.  Montreal Canadiens are established on the same day.

Births

January to June
February 4 – Jack Shadbolt, painter (d.1998)
February 14 – A. M. Klein, poet, journalist, novelist, short story writer and lawyer (d.1972)
March 2 – Art Alexandre, ice hockey player (d.1976)
March 19 – John Fauquier, war hero
March 20 – Jack Bush, painter (d.1977)
March 22 – Gabrielle Roy, author (d.1983)
April 6 – George Isaac Smith, lawyer, politician and Premier of Nova Scotia (d.1982)
May 8 – Samuel Boulanger, politician (d.1989)
May 29 – Red Horner, ice hockey player (d.2005)
May 31 – Aurore Gagnon, murder victim (d.1920)
June 23 – David Lewis, lawyer and politician (d.1981)

July to December
August 12 – Albert Bruce Matthews, commander of the 2nd Canadian Infantry Division during the Second World War (d.1991)
August 15 – Maurice Breton, politician and lawyer (d.2001)
August 18 – Gérard Filion, businessman and journalist (d.2005)
September 12 – Donald MacDonald, labour leader
October 12 – Dorothy Livesay, poet (d.1996)
October 19 – Robert Beatty, actor (d.1992)
October 24 – Sheila Watson, novelist, critic and teacher (d.1998)
November 3 – Russell Paulley, politician (d.1984)

Full date unknown
Ronald Martland, Justice of the Supreme Court of Canada (d.1997)

Deaths
May 5 – Daniel Lionel Hanington, politician and 5th Premier of New Brunswick (b.1835)
May 7 – William Hallett Ray, politician (b. 1825)
May 12 – Michel Auger, politician (b.1830)
October 7 – William Thomas Pipes, politician and Premier of Nova Scotia (b.1850)
October 27 – James William Bain, politician (b.1838)
November 14 – Joshua Slocum, seaman, adventurer, writer, and first man to sail single-handedly around the world (b.1844)
December 17 – George Cox, mayor of Ottawa (b.1834)

Historical documents

Government report on huge tar sand deposit in northern Alberta

Origins of Canadian Red Cross Society outlined in Senate bill incorporating it

Union leaders object after Archbishop of St. John's disapproves of Fishermen's Protective Union as secret society

Report of Toronto lecture where British suffragette Emmeline Pankhurst explains rationale for extreme measures

Scottish editorial asks whether Scotsmen should take up farming in Canada

House of Commons agriculture committee learns about types, history and marketing of Lake Erie apples (District No. 1)

Pilot John McCurdy's testimony on flights and development of Silver Dart airplane

Political cartoon about Canadian wheat milled in Minnesota

Postcard: Photo shows "Broadway Falls," created when water from overflowing creek poured into Broadway and Heather St. intersection, Vancouver

References

 
Years of the 20th century in Canada
Canada
1900s in Canada
Canada